Irving Park is an 'L' station on the CTA's Brown Line. It is an elevated station with two side platforms, located in Chicago's North Center neighborhood. The stations adjacent to Irving Park are Montrose, one half mile (0.8 km) to the north, and Addison, one half mile (0.8 km) to the south.

History

Irving Park station opened in 1907 as part of the Northwestern Elevated Railroad's Ravenswood line. In CTA's skip-stop service on the Brown Line, instituted in 1949, Irving Park was an "AB" station.

In 2006, the CTA began the Brown Line Capacity Expansion Project, which involved the renovation and reconstruction of Brown Line stations to allow eight car trains to run on the line and to ensure that all stations met Americans with Disabilities Act (ADA) requirements. Irving Park station closed between December 3, 2007, and December 6, 2008, and was completely rebuilt.

Bus connections
CTA
  80 Irving Park

Notes and references

Notes

References

External links 

Irving Park (Ravenswood Line) Station Page
 Train schedule (PDF) at CTA official site
Irving Park Road entrance from Google Maps Street View

CTA Brown Line stations
Railway stations in the United States opened in 1907
1907 establishments in Illinois